Bahrabise is an urban municipality located in Sindhupalchok District of Bagmati Province of Nepal.

Demographics
At the time of the 1991 Nepal census it had a population of 6132 and had 1161 houses in the village.

Development
It lies on Araniko Highway - the 114 km-long highway which connects the capital city Kathmandu to the Chinese border in the north. The area touching the highway is very developed compared to other areas and hence called 'Bahrabise Bazar'. Each ward in the VDC is connected to the highway by graveled roads.

There is facility electricity in each house of this VDC. The VDC has a good facility of telephone network (provided by Nepal Telecom) and mobile phone networks (provided by Nepal Telecom, Ncell and Smart Cell). There is broadband internet facility in places where PSTN telephone line has reached. There is a local cable television network which provides various TV channels in various parts of the VDC and outside.

The city has four private schools including Private Paradise Secondary School, Ketu English Boarding School, Chandeshwori English Boarding School and Keystone Public School and several other governmental schools. Shree Sharada Higher Secondary School and Shree Kshyamadevi Higher Secondary School are the most renowned governmental high school of this area.

Because of its proximity to the Chinese border, the businesses here are influenced by the Chinese market. Most of the people in Bahrabise Bazar are involved in business of the Chinese products including clothing, bedding, food items, electronic devices, etc.

2015 Nepal earthquake
The village was affected by the earthquake on 25 April 2015. A joint coordination committee among all political parties in the three constituencies of the Sindhupalchok district was formed to carry out a rescue mission in the village.

References

External links
 Official website

Populated places in Sindhupalchowk District